The following is a list of universities and colleges in Shandong. As of 2012, there are 154 institutions of higher learning in the province, out of which 62 offer bachelor's degree studies. 29 colleges and universities also offer master's degree level of studies, as do four research institutes.

Note: The list will be arranged in the default order followed the one provided by MOE

Branch schools of other national universities 
Harbin Institute of Technology at Weihai (哈尔滨工业大学(威海), Weihai) Ω
China Agricultural University at Yantai (中国农业大学(烟台), Yantai) Ω

Branch schools of other universities 
Harbin University of Science and Technology at Rongcheng (哈尔滨理工大学(荣成), Rongcheng)

Provincial colleges with associate-degree studies
Qingdao Technical College (青岛职业技术学院, Qingdao)
Rizhao Polytechnic (日照职业技术学院, Rizhao)
Zibo Vocational Institute (淄博职业学院, Zibo)

Private colleges with associate-degree studies
Shandong Foreign Languages Vocational College (山东外国语职业学院, Rizhao)

References

External links
List of Chinese Higher Education Institutions — Ministry of Education
List of Chinese universities, including official links
Shandong Institutions Admitting International Students

 
Shandong